You Are My Flower is the first children's music album by Elizabeth Mitchell, released in 1998 by Little Bird Records.

Track listing
"This Little Light of Mine" — 2:07
"You Are My Flower" — 2:46
"John the Rabbit" — 0:57
"One Day, Two Days, Three Days Old" — 1:56
"Freight Train" — 2:58
"Shoo-Fly" — 1:03
"Little Sack of Sugar" — 1:55
"Rock & Roll" — 1:20
"Jingle Bells" — 1:59
"Lovers Lane" — 2:37
"Sylvie" — 2:43
"Pony Boy" — 2:29

1998 albums
Elizabeth Mitchell (musician) albums